"Love Is Bigger Than Anything in Its Way" is a song by Irish rock band U2. It is the twelfth track on their fourteenth studio album, Songs of Experience, and was released as its third single on 23 April 2018. In July 2018, it became U2's fourth number-one song on the Billboard Dance Club Songs chart, and their first since their previous number one "Beautiful Day" peaked in 2001.

Background

In an interview with iHeartRadio, lead singer Bono said "Love Is Bigger Than Anything in Its Way" was about using love to overcome personal difficulties. The song features Andrew Taggart of the Chainsmokers on keyboards.

Release
"Love Is Bigger Than Anything in Its Way" was released on 23 April 2018. In May 2018, an acoustic rendition of "Love Is Bigger Than Anything in Its Way" was recorded by U2 at Third Man Records for vinyl. Throughout May 2018, multiple remixes were released including ones by The Funk Hunters and Cheat Codes. On 4 June 2018, American singer Beck also issued a remix version of the track.

Music video
The first music video for "Love Is Bigger Than Anything in Its Way" was filmed in the fall of 2017. Photographer David Mushegain came up with the idea of incorporating his project on the Dublin youth lifestyle into a video after listening to U2's song. He solely filmed the video using a movie camera and included various youth from his prior Dublin lifestyle project. In the music video officially released on 27 April 2018, the video focuses on a group of Dublin teenagers dancing and posing while the song plays in the background. Mushegain initially planned on solely featuring teenagers who identify as LGBT+ but later decided to include Dubliners with various sexual orientations.

Chart performance
On 24 July 2018, U2's rendition of "Love Is Bigger Than Anything in Its Way" peaked at number one on the Billboard Dance Club Songs chart. It became the band's fourth number one on the chart and their first since "Beautiful Day" in 2001.

Weekly charts

Year-end charts

Beck remix

Music video
On 12 July 2018, a music video of Beck's remix was released. In the clay animation remix video, a man is preparing to embark on a journey while coping with the death of his wife.

Reception
Lake Schatz of Consequence of Sound said Beck's version was a more energetic rendition of U2's song. Alternatively, Joshua Copperman of Spin opined that the track sounded like a Jack Antonoff song but that Beck had created a modern-day version compared to the original.

Release history

References

2017 songs
2018 singles
U2 songs
Song recordings produced by Jacknife Lee
Songs written by Bono
Songs written by Adam Clayton
Songs written by the Edge
Songs written by Larry Mullen Jr.